Abdel Mawgoud El Habashy (born 10 March 1953) is an Egyptian diplomat who most recently served as Ambassador to Kazakhstan and the republic of Kyrgyzstan. He heads the Legal Department in the Ministry of Foreign Affairs.

He has a bachelor's degree in economics and political sciences (1975) and a master's degree in Middle Eastern studies from the University of Cairo.

During his time in Kazakhstan he has spearheaded the building of the first ever Egyptian Mosque and Egyptian University in the region. Nur Mubarak is a project that cost more than 2 billion dollars. Egypt funded the salaries of the professors and staff through The Ministry of Awqaaf, The Ministry of Foreign Affairs, Al-Azhar Al-Sharif and The Ministry of Higher Education.

He has also worked on multiple projects which have advanced trade relations in oil between Central Asia and Egypt.

Working within the Ministry of Foreign Affairs, he has held various posts in the following diplomatic missions: Panama, Cameroon, Azerbaijan, and Minister Plenipotentiary in  Peru.

References

External links
Egypt.com
Picture of Abdel Mawgoud Ahmed El Habashy making his first call on Lawrence Gonzi, Prime Minister of Malta. - 30 September 2009

Egyptian diplomats
Ambassadors of Egypt to Kazakhstan
Ambassadors of Egypt to Kyrgyzstan
1953 births
Living people
Cairo University alumni